Tishomingo County is a county located in the northeastern corner of the U.S. state of Mississippi. As of the 2020 census, the population was 18,850. Its county seat is Iuka.

History

Tishomingo County was organized February 9, 1836, from Chickasaw lands that were ceded to the United States. The Chickasaw were forced by Indian Removal to relocate to lands in the Indian Territory (now Oklahoma).

Jacinto was the original county seat of Tishomingo County and its historic courthouse building is listed on the National Register of Historic Places.

Parts of the northeastern side of Tishomingo county are part of the Battle of Shiloh Civil War battlefield.

In 1870 the area was divided into Alcorn, Prentiss and Tishomingo counties. Tishomingo's county seat was relocated to Iuka.

Geography

The highest natural point in Mississippi, the  Woodall Mountain, is located in the county. Tishomingo County is the only county in Mississippi with outcroppings of natural limestone formations.

Adjacent counties
 Hardin County, Tennessee (north)
 Lauderdale County, Alabama (northeast)
 Colbert County, Alabama (east)
 Franklin County, Alabama (southeast)
 Itawamba County (south)
 Prentiss County (southwest)
 Alcorn County (northwest)

Major highways

 U.S. Route 72
 Mississippi Highway 4
 Mississippi Highway 25
 Mississippi Highway 30
 Mississippi Highway 172
 Mississippi Highway 350
 Mississippi Highway 364
 Mississippi Highway 365
 Mississippi Highway 366
 Mississippi Highway 760
 Natchez Trace Parkway

National protected area
 Natchez Trace Parkway

Demographics

2020 census

As of the 2020 United States census, there were 18,850 people, 7,635 households, and 5,035 families residing in the county.

2010 census
As of the 2010 United States Census, there were 19,593 people living in the county. 94.5% were White, 2.6% Black or African American, 0.2% Native American, 0.1% Asian, 1.7% of some other race and 0.8% of two or more races. 2.8% were Hispanic or Latino (of any race).

2000 census
As of the census of 2000 there were 19,163 people, 7,917 households, and 5,573 families living in the county. The population density was 45 people per square mile (17/km2). There were 9,553 housing units at an average density of 22 per square mile (9/km2). The racial makeup of the county was 94.93% White, 3.11% Black or African American, 0.21% Native American, 0.08% Asian, 0.01% Pacific Islander, 1.06% from other races, and 0.59% from two or more races. 1.79% of the population were Hispanic or Latino of any race.

By 2005 the population was 93.4% non-Hispanic white. 3.6% of the population was African-American. 2.6% of the population was Latino.

At 93.4% of the county's population, Tishomingo County has the highest percentage of Non-Hispanic whites in the state of Mississippi.

In 2000 there were 7,917 households, out of which 30.2% had children under the age of 18 living with them, 57.1% were married couples living together, 10.1% had a female householder with no husband present, and 29.6% were non-families. 27.5% of all households were made up of individuals, and 12.8% had someone living alone who was 65 years of age or older. The average household size was 2.39 and the average family size was 2.89.

In the county, the population was spread out, with 23.2% under the age of 18, 7.8% from 18 to 24, 27.5% from 25 to 44, 24.7% from 45 to 64, and 16.8% who were 65 years of age or older. The median age was 39 years. For every 100 females there were 92.7 males. For every 100 females age 18 and over, there were 89.8 males.

The median income for a household in the county was $28,315, and the median income for a family was $34,378. Males had a median income of $28,109 versus $19,943 for females. The per capita income for the county was $15,395. About 11% of families and 14.1% of the population were below the poverty line, including 15.6% of those under age 18 and 15.6% of those age 65 or over.

Recreation
 Tishomingo State Park is located in the foothills of the Appalachian Mountains in Tishomingo County, Mississippi, north of Tupelo, Mississippi. Activities in the park including canoeing, rock climbing, fishing and hiking. The park was constructed by the Civilian Conservation Corps during the 1930s. Many of the original buildings are still standing. The park is named for an early leader of the Chickasaw nation, Tishomingo (1734-1838).
 J.P. Coleman State Park is a state park in the U.S. state of Mississippi. It is located north of Iuka off Mississippi Highway 25. It sits along the banks of the Tennessee River and Pickwick Lake. The park is named for James P. Coleman, a former governor of Mississippi. Activities include sailing, swimming, camping, hiking, skiing, and fishing for smallmouth bass.
 Bay Springs Lake is a reservoir on the Tennessee-Tombigbee Waterway in the U.S. state of Mississippi. It is impounded by the Jamie Whitten Lock and Dam. The lake is approximately nine miles long, between waterway mile markers 412 at the dam, and 421 near the entrance to the divide cut.
 The Tennessee–Tombigbee Waterway (popularly known as the "Tenn-Tom") is a  artificial waterway that provides a connecting link between the Tennessee and Tombigbee rivers. The waterway begins at Pickwick Lake on the Tennessee River, then flows southward through northeast Mississippi and west Alabama, finally connecting with the established Warrior-Tombigbee navigation system at Demopolis, Alabama.

Communities

City
 Iuka (county seat)

Towns
 Belmont
 Burnsville
 Golden
 Tishomingo

Villages
 Paden

Census-designated place
 Dennis

Unincorporated communities
 Bloody Springs
 Doskie
 Eastport
 Midway
 Mingo
 Oldham
 Pittsburg
 Short

Ghost town
 Holcut

Government and politics

Board of supervisors
 Eric Booker, District 1
 Nicky McRae, District 2
 Michael Busby, District 3
 Jeff Holt, District 4
 Greg Collier, District 5

Chancery clerk
 Peyton Cummings

Circuit Clerk
 Josh McNatt

State representatives
 Representative Lester Carpenter, Mississippi House of Representatives - District 1
 Representative Mark DuVall, Mississippi House of Representatives - District 19
 Senator Eric Powell, Mississippi State Senate - District 4
 Senator Daniel Sparks, Mississippi State Senate - District 5

Presidential election results
Tishomingo County is solidly Republican at the Presidential level, having last voted for a Democrat in 1992 when it voted for Bill Clinton. Since then the closest a Democrat has come to winning the county was in 1996 when Clinton narrowly lost to Bob Dole. In 2020 Donald Trump received 86.8 percent of the vote, the best result for a Republican since 1972 when Richard Nixon received 89.2 percent of the vote.

See also
 Battle of Iuka
 Natchez Trace Parkway
 National Register of Historic Places listings in Tishomingo County, Mississippi
 Woodall Mountain

References

Further reading

External links

 
 Tishomingo County Development Foundation
 Tishomingo County Historical and Genealogical Society
 Tishomingo County Tourism Council

Mississippi counties
 
1836 establishments in Mississippi
Mississippi placenames of Native American origin
Counties of Appalachia
Populated places established in 1836